is a Japanese model and member of idol group Sakurazaka46. She is represented by Sony Music Records and is an exclusive model with fashion magazine with.

Career

Keyakizaka46
On August 21, 2015, Kobayashi along with 22 other members were announced for the newly created idol group, Toriizaka46 (now Sakurazaka46).  Kobayashi made her musical debut with Keyakizaka46's first single, Silent Majority. In October of the same year, Kobayashi made her runway debut at the GirlsAward 2016 Autumn/Winter fashion show.

As of 2019, Kobayashi has made an appearance in all Keyakizaka46 singles. She formed a duo named  with Yui Imaizumi, first appearing in Silent Majority with the song "Shibugakawa". With Imaizumi's graduation in 2018, Kobayashi and Mizuho Habu formed another duo named , appearing in Ambivalent with "302-Goshitsu". She held performance center roles typically held by Yurina Hirate when Hirate was unavailable, including the 60th Japan Record Awards and the 69th NHK Kōhaku Uta Gassen. With Hirate's departure in January 2020, Kobayashi will hold the center spot in the upcoming single, "Dare ga Sonokane o Narasunoka?"

Other ventures 
Kobayashi is an exclusive model with fashion magazine with since 27 July 2018. Additionally, on 13 March 2019, she released a photo-book titled , published by Kadokawa.

Kobayashi's first independent acting role was in the 2020 live-action adaptation of Wasteful Days of High School Girls by TV Asahi. She played the role of Lily Someya, a multiracial transfer student; Kobayashi dyed her hair blonde for the role. She will appear in Sakura, an upcoming movie to be released 13 November 2020.

Discography

Filmography

Film

TV series

References

External links 
Yui Kobayashi's page on Keyakizaka46's website

1999 births
Living people
21st-century Japanese actresses
Japanese female models
Japanese idols
Keyakizaka46 members
Musicians from Saitama Prefecture
Sakurazaka46 members